Emily Carmichael may refer to:
 Emily Carmichael (novelist), American novelist
 Emily Carmichael (filmmaker), American filmmaker
 Pseudonym of Emily Horne (born 1978)